Anke Pietrangeli (born 16 November 1982) is a South African singer. She was the winner of the second season of popular talent search series Idols in South Africa in 2003. Like her predecessor, Heinz Winckler, Anke also had a nickname: The Kimberley Diamond. Pietrangeli was convinced to enter by her brother, Sven, who was always certain that his sister would be a star.

Songs performed on Idols
Top 32: Unforgettable by Nat King Cole 
Top 12: Don't Know Why by Norah Jones 
Top 10 :Moments Away by Mango Groove 
Top 9: Independent Love Song by Scarlet
Top 7: It Had To Be You by Harry Connick, Jr. 
Top 6: Here I Am by Bryan Adams 
Top 5: Yesterday by The Beatles 
Top 5: From Me To You by The Beatles 
Top 5: Cry by Faith Hill 
Top 5: There You'll Be by Faith Hill 
Top 3: Like A Prayer by Madonna 
Top 3: True Colors by Cyndi Lauper 
Top 3: I Don't Wanna Miss A Thing by Aerosmith 
Finale: Independent Love Song by Scarlet
Finale: Silver Lining 
Finale: Unforgettable by Nat King Cole

Discography
Albums
Idols
By Heart (March 2004)
Limbo (July 2006)
Tribute to the Great Female Vocalists (November 2008) 

'SinglesSilver LiningBy HeartWe're UnbreakableMy RadioStay If You Will''

References

External links
Official Website

1982 births
Living people
Idols South Africa winners
21st-century South African women singers